Propoxate (INN; R7464) is an unmarketed anesthetic related to etomidate and metomidate. Although not employed in the treatment of humans, it has been used as an anesthetic in fish.

References

Ethyl esters
GABAA receptor positive allosteric modulators
General anesthetics
Imidazoles
Janssen Pharmaceutica